Austin Watkins Jr. (born February 16, 1998) is an American football wide receiver for the Birmingham Stallions of the United States Football League (USFL). He played college football at UAB. Watkins has been a member of the San Francisco 49ers, Tampa Bay Buccaneers, Saskatchewan Roughriders, and Memphis Showboats.

Early life and high school
Watkins grew up in Fort Myers, Florida, and attended North Fort Myers High School.

College career
Watkins began his collegiate career at Dodge City Community College. As a freshman, he caught 38 passes for 376 yards and one touchdown and committed to transfer to UAB after his sophomore. Watkins had 24 receptions for 330 yards with four touchdowns as a sophomore.

Watkins played in four games in his first season with the Blazers before opting to redshirt the year. He became a starter going into his redshirt junior season was named second-team All-Conference USA after catching 57 passes for 1,092 yards and six touchdowns. As a redshirt senior, Watkins was named first-team All-Conference USA after finishing the season with 34 receptions for 468 yards with three touchdowns.

Professional career

San Francisco 49ers
Watkins signed with the San Francisco 49ers as an undrafted free agent on May 13, 2021. He was waived/injured on August 17, 2021 and placed on injured reserve. He was released on August 25. He was re-signed to the 49ers practice squad on November 3, 2021. He was released on November 23.

Tampa Bay Buccaneers
On January 31, 2022, Watkins signed a reserve/future contract with the Tampa Bay Buccaneers. He was waived on May 16.

Saskatchewan Roughriders 
Watkins signed with Saskatchewan Roughriders of the Canadian Football League (CFL) on August 7, 2022. He was released by the Riders on August 18, 2022, having spent the entirety of his tenure with the club on the practice roster.

Memphis Showboats
Watkins signed with the Tampa Bay Bandits of the USFL on October 22, 2022. Watkins and all other Tampa Bay Bandits players were all transferred to the Memphis Showboats after it was announced that the Bandits were taking a hiatus and that the Showboats were joining the league.

Birmingham Stallions
Watkins was traded to the Birmingham Stallions on January 11, 2023.

References

External links
UAB Blazers bio

1998 births
Living people
American football wide receivers
Dodge City Conquistadors football players
UAB Blazers football players
San Francisco 49ers players
Players of American football from Florida
Tampa Bay Bandits (2022) players
Tampa Bay Buccaneers players
Birmingham Stallions (2022) players